The  WDSF World Formation Latin Championship is the main annual formation International Latin dancesport championship worldwide.

Summary of championships

References

External links 
WDSF

Dancesport competitions
Formation Latin
Latin dances